Blackburn Arena is an Olympic-size ice arena in Blackburn, England. It is the home of Blackburn Hawks and Blackburn Eagles ice hockey clubs. The arena was built to coincide with Manchester’s 1996 Summer Olympic bid, with the possibility of boxing contests being held there. It was refurbished in 2005.

The arena was originally owned by Blackburn Council before being sold to the Peel Group. It was subsequently sold to the Silver Blades in 2015. 

WCW (World Championship Wrestling) held a tour event at the arena in October 1993, as did the WWF (World Wrestling Federation) the following year, and rock band Status Quo held the only concert to date there in November 1994 as part of their Thirsty Work world tour.

A junior developmemt scheme for ice hockey is based at the arena, with teams for under 10s, under 12s, under 14s, under 16s and under 18s. These teams all go under the name of Blackburn Junior Hawks. 

The arena is open seven days a week for public ice skating sessions, and includes a café and hockey shop.

References

Buildings and structures in Blackburn
Indoor ice hockey venues in England
Sport in Blackburn